Laura Jane Lowther, known professionally as Kučka (stylised in all caps; pronounced ; Serbo-Croatian for "bitch"), is an English-born Australian singer and producer. Lowther is known for her solo works, in addition to her collaborations with Flume, Vince Staples and ASAP Rocky. She has been praised for her "dreamy, forward-thinking, electronic pop songs" and her "delicate beats, and ethereal vocals". Her debut album, Wrestling, was released on 30 April 2021.

Early life
Kučka grew up in Liverpool. She said she found it a strange place to grow up in, and said "I wasn't very creative when I was there". At 16, Kučka moved to Perth, Australia. On her parents' computer, Kučka began to create music using GarageBand. At that time, Kučka was creating emo music, which contained "angsty lyrics with guitar looping". She notes Shaking the Habitual by the Knife as an inspiration: "I used to thrash Shaking The Habitual when I worked at a cinema in Perth. I'd be so worried that the bosses would come in because it gets pretty wild".

Career
Kučka released her debut eponymous EP in 2012. It was later re-released on an Australian experimental label, Wood and Wire. She collaborated with A$AP Rocky in 2013, singing background vocals for some tracks on his debut album, Long. Live. ASAP. In the same year, she received five nominations and one win from the West Australian Music Industry Awards (WAMis) for the release of the single "Unconditional". Her sophomore EP, Unconditional, was released in 2015. For the EP, Kučka received Best Electronic Act and Best Experimental Act at the 2015 WAMis, as well as 4 other nominations. The EP was compared to FKA Twigs, and called "shimmery, warm and intimate."

In the following years, Kučka was featured on multiple Flume albums. She appeared on 2016's Skin, on the tracks "Smoke & Retribution" and "Numb & Getting Colder", and again on 2017's "Hyperreal". She was also featured on 2019's Hi This Is Flume, on "Voices". Her debut album, Wrestling, was released on 30 April 2021 and featured co-production from Flume, Nosaj Thing, Vegyn, and Exmoor Emperor.

In March 2023, Kučka announced the Cry Cry Cry Australian Tour 2023, alongside the release of a single of the same name.

Personal life 
As of 2017, Kučka resides in California. She has been in a relationship with Dillon Howl since 2017. They married in 2019. Howl is Kučka's creative director and co-directed all of Wrestling music videos. Kučka's stage name is the Serbo-Croatian word for "bitch". It was given to her as an affectionate nickname by a Serbian friend.

Discography

Studio albums

Extended plays

Singles

As lead artist

As featured artist

West Australian Music Industry Awards
The West Australian Music Industry Awards (WAMIs) are annual awards presented to the local contemporary music industry, put on annually by the Western Australian Music Industry Association Inc (WAM). Kučka has won six awards.
 

|-
| 2013
| Kučka
| Best Experimental Act
| 
|-
| rowspan="3"| 2014
| rowspan="2"| Kučka
| Best Experimental Act
| 
|-
| Best Electronic Act
| 
|-
| "Unconditional"
| Best Single
| 
|-
| rowspan="2"| 2015
| rowspan="2"| Kučka
| Best Experimental Act
| 
|-
| Best Electronic Act
| 
|}

References

External links
 

21st-century Australian women singers
Australian record producers
English emigrants to Australia
Living people
Musicians from Liverpool
Musicians from Perth, Western Australia
Year of birth missing (living people)